Marcelo Vieira da Silva Júnior (born 12 May 1988), known as Marcelo, is a Brazilian professional footballer who plays as a left-back for Campeonato Brasileiro Série A club Fluminense. Known for his offensive capabilities, trickery, and technical qualities, Marcelo is often regarded as one of the greatest left-backs of all time. He spent most of his career with Spanish club Real Madrid and is the club's most decorated player, with 25 trophies won.

Starting his professional career with Fluminense in 2005, Marcelo won a Campeonato Carioca title on his debut season and was named in the 2006 Brasileirão Team of the Season. In January 2007, he joined Real Madrid for an $8 million fee. In Madrid, he went on to be a mainstay and has won five UEFA Champions League titles and six La Liga titles, among other honours. In 2021, Marcelo became the captain of Real Madrid from the start of the 2021–22 season, making him the first foreign captain since 1904. After leaving Madrid in 2022, he had a five-month spell at Olympiacos, followed by a return to Fluminense in 2023. He has been named in the FIFPro World XI six times, the UEFA Team of the Year three times, and La Liga's Team of the Season in 2016. He was also named to France Football's "Team of the Decade (2010–2019)".

Having debuted for Brazil in 2006, Marcelo was called up for the 2008 Olympic squad, where he won a bronze medal. Four years later, he was part of Brazil's 2012 Olympic team as one of the three over-age players, winning a silver medal. Marcelo was selected to play in the 2013 FIFA Confederations Cup and started all five matches, as Brazil won 3–0 against Spain in the final. He was part of Brazil's squad at two FIFA World Cups (2014 and 2018) and he was named in both tournament's Dream Teams.

Club career

Fluminense
Marcelo started playing futsal at age nine and by age 13, he was on the books of Fluminense in Rio de Janeiro. He came from a very poor background and even considered quitting football, but his grandfather convinced him to continue with the sport.

Real Madrid
Marcelo joined Real Madrid during the January transfer window in 2007. On his arrival, club President Ramón Calderón said, "He is an important signing for us. He is a young player who will inject some freshness into the side and is part of our plan to bring younger players into the squad. We're very happy because he's a pearl that half of Europe wanted." Many spectators hailed him as Brazilian and Real Madrid great Roberto Carlos' potential successor in the left-back role.

Marcelo made his debut as a substitute in the 2–0 defeat against Deportivo La Coruña on 7 January 2007. On 14 April 2007, then coach Fabio Capello gave Marcelo his first start for Real Madrid against Racing de Santander. Real Madrid controversially lost the game 2–1. In the 2007–08 season, Marcelo started nearly all of Madrid's league games under the new manager Bernd Schuster. His ability, speed running across the field, attack, and defence had enabled him to become a very important player for Real Madrid.

After a string of poor performances in 2009, Marcelo found himself on the bench for much of the remaining season while under new manager Juande Ramos, mainly as deputy to the more defensive-minded Gabriel Heinze. Ramos deployed Marcelo as a winger on more than one occasion, and the Brazilian adapted well to his new role. He scored his first goal after receiving a heel flick from striker Gonzalo Higuaín and slotting the ball past the goalkeeper in Madrid's 4–0 thumping of Sporting Gijón. After the game, coach Ramos declared that Marcelo's future would be positioned as a winger, but will push back to defense when required. Marcelo scored his second goal for Real Madrid in a victory over Almería, a powerful strike from outside the box with his weaker right foot.

On 18 April 2009, he scored his third goal of his Real Madrid career, when he scored the only goal of the game against Huelva away from home. He scored his fourth goal against Sevilla at the Ramón Sánchez Pizjuán in April 2009.

2009–2011: Rise to prominence
Under the next head coach Manuel Pellegrini, Marcelo consistently featured in the starting XI for his versatility and pace along the left flank in offensive and defensive roles. He continued to be employed as a left-winger under Pellegrini, and reached the top of the assist charts of La Liga in the 2009–10 season. He admitted in a press conference at the end of 2009, "I now feel better playing as a winger." His successful performance in Real Madrid's 2009–10 campaign earned him a contract extension on 5 February 2010 with the club until June 2015. This season proved to be his breakthrough season at the club.

In the 2010–11 season under new coach José Mourinho, Marcelo was back in his natural position of left back. He started all league games, paying back the coach's confidence in him with defensive steel and attacking intent and gained the coach's admiration. On 25 November 2010, Marcelo was named as a part of the 55 player shortlist for the FIFA World XI. He scored his first goal of the new season in a 1–0 win against Espanyol on 13 February. He had a terrific match against Lyon in the Champions League. Showing his attacking flair and defensive skills, he opened the scoring with his first-ever Champions League goal and assisted Karim Benzema's goal, at the end he was named man of the match, of which Real went on to win 3–0, and progressed to the quarter-finals for the first time since 2004. Marcelo then continued his fine season by scoring in the second leg of the semi-finals against Barcelona in the Camp Nou. The game ended 1–1, but Real Madrid lost by an aggregate score of 3–1 since they lost 2–0 at home in the first leg. Marcelo's successful campaign in the Champions League earned him a starting spot in UEFA's starting XI. Marcelo was heavily praised by the worldwide media during that season, and many called him the best left back in the world. Diego Maradona said he was the third best player in La Liga, after Cristiano Ronaldo and Lionel Messi.

2011–2013: First-team mainstay

Marcelo was sent off on 17 August 2011 during Madrid's 3–2 loss to Barcelona. On 3 December 2011, Marcelo scored Madrid's third goal in a 3–0 victory over Sporting Gijón in La Liga.

Paolo Maldini gave credits to Marcelo and called him the current left back, "who is a great attacker and a defender, a specialist of both areas."

Roberto Carlos named Marcelo as the world's best left back, saying. "He had more ability than me with the ball and he joins in better," and even called him his heir. Marcelo had shown great performances as a left back, such as in the Champions League quarter-finals against Cypriot club APOEL, while entering as a substitute in the 75th minute for Fábio Coentrão. Marcelo was part of the starting XI as Real Madrid claimed their 32nd league title.

Marcelo scored his first goal of the season against Manchester City in the Champions League group stage on 19 September, Real's first goal of a 3–2 win at the Santiago Bernabéu.

As of February 2013, Marcelo had returned from injury and captained Real Madrid on 23 February at the Estadio Riazor which ended in a 2–1 victory for Los Merengues. On 20 April, he played as the captain again against Real Betis at the Santiago Bernabéu. In the 14th minute, he sustained a muscle injury after intercepting a long through-ball, but the game ended in 3–1 victory for the home side.

2013–2018: European and domestic success
Marcelo scored the opening goal for Real Madrid against Chelsea in the Guinness International Champions Cup 2013 final on 7 August; Real Madrid won 3–1. During the league season, he played 28 matches, and scored one goal, in a 3–0 win over Levante on 9 March.

Marcelo scored Real Madrid's third goal of their 4–1 win in the Champions League final against city rivals Atlético Madrid, with an extra-time strike from outside the box after coming on as a substitute for Fábio Coentrão.

On 10 July 2015, Marcelo signed a new contract with Real Madrid, keeping him at the club until 2020. On 18 October 2015, he scored his first goal of the season by scoring Real Madrid's first goal in a 3–0 home win against Levante.

He was a regular starter when the team won the Champions League, beating Atlético Madrid again in the final on penalties.

He played 30 matches when Madrid won the La Liga and was a regular starter when Madrid won the Champions League after defeating Juventus 4–1 in the final.

On 13 September 2017, Marcelo signed a new contract which would keep him at the club until summer 2022. During the Champions League, he made eleven appearances, while scoring three goals, with Madrid winning their third consecutive and 13th overall Champions League title after defeating Liverpool 3–1 in the final.

2018–2022: Final seasons, captaincy, and departure
During the season, he made 34 appearances, winning the Club World Cup for the third consecutive time.

Marcelo made 15 appearances during the league season, as Real Madrid won the league title.

He appeared sporadically in the 2020–21 season due to various injuries and was replaced by Ferland Mendy in the left-back position. He appeared in a total of 19 matches in all competitions as Real Madrid finished second in the league behind Atlético Madrid.

On 16 June 2021, it was announced that he would become the captain of Real Madrid from the start of the 2021–22 season, as the player who had been in the first team for the longest period of time after Sergio Ramos; he was assigned the role after Ramos left, making him the first foreign captain since 1904. 

On 19 October 2021, Marcelo made his 100th Champions League appearance in a 5–0 win at Shakhtar Donetsk.
 
On 30 April 2022, after winning La Liga, Marcelo became the player with most titles in the history of Real Madrid, surpassing Paco Gento, with 24. 

On 28 May 2022, Marcelo lifted his fifth Champions League trophy after defeating Liverpool 1–0 in the final at the Stade de France, despite not featuring in the game itself. After the final, Marcelo announced that he would leave the club after 15 years.

Olympiacos 
On 3 September 2022, Marcelo signed for Super League Greece club Olympiacos. In the Greek Cup round of 16, he scored three goals in two matches against Atromitos. On 18 February 2023, Marcelo terminated his Olympiacos contract, departing from the club after five months.

Return to Fluminense 
On 24 February 2023, Fluminense announced the return of Marcelo to the club.

International career

Marcelo scored on his Brazil debut on 5 September 2006, in a 2–0 victory against Wales at Tottenham Hotspur's White Hart Lane. He picked up the ball just outside the Wales box and shot for a traditional Brazilian full-back goal. Marcelo has been compared to former Brazil national team left-back Roberto Carlos, who also played for Real Madrid. The two had played together during the second half of the 2006–07 season before Carlos' move to Turkish club Fenerbahçe.

He was part of the 2008 Olympic squad as part of Brazil's under-23 squad, where he won a bronze medal.

In May 2010, he was named as one of the seven players serving as backup for Brazil's 2010 FIFA World Cup squad. Despite not being called up by then Brazil coach Dunga, he was selected again by new boss Mano Menezes for a friendly against the United States on 10 August 2010. He was the Man of the Match for a friendly 2–1 win against Mexico away on 11 October 2011, scoring the winner by dribbling past several players and then blasting the goal into the net.

He was part of Brazil's 2012 Summer Olympics as one of the three overage players, with Brazil winning a silver medal.

Marcelo was selected as a member of Luiz Felipe Scolari's 23-man Brazil squad that took part in the 2013 FIFA Confederations Cup on home soil. He was part of the Brazil's starting lineup for all five matches, including the 3–0 victory over Spain in the final on 30 June, at the Maracanã Stadium.

In the 2014 FIFA World Cup, which was once again played on home soil, Marcelo scored an own goal in the 11th minute of the opening game against Croatia on 12 June, deflecting a shot by Nikica Jelavić for the first goal of the competition. It was the first own goal that Brazil had conceded at the World Cup, although they eventually won the match 3–1.

In May 2018, Marcelo was named in the final squad for the 2018 FIFA World Cup. He wore the captain's armband in the first match and was a starter in four of the five matches Brazil played in the competition, until its elimination against Belgium in the quarter-finals on 6 July 2018, in what remains his last match with the national team. In May 2019, he was omitted from Brazil's squad for the 2019 Copa América.

Style of play

After his breakthrough season, in 2011 Marcelo was praised by football legends such as Paolo Maldini and Diego Maradona, the latter of whom also called him the best player in the world in his position. Due to his attacking prowess, nationality, and playing role, Marcelo has frequently been compared to compatriot Roberto Carlos, who himself described Marcelo as his heir in 2012, and also labelled him as the world's best left back; regarding Marcelo's technical skills, he commented: "Marcelo possesses a better technical ability than me." Due to his skill, attacking abilities, achievements, and decisive performances in important games, Marcelo is considered by many in the sport to be the best left back in the world, one of Brazil's best players ever, and one of the greatest left backs of all time.

Known mainly for his offensive capabilities, trickery, and technical qualities, Marcelo plays mainly as a left-sided attacking full-back or wing-back, but can also operate as a left winger, or even in midfield. His flair, grace, touch, and control on the ball, coupled with his speed, agility, and dribbling skills, frequently see him beat opponents in one on one situations with elaborate feints, such as step overs. His explosive pace, energy, and clever movement, both on and off the ball, also make him a dangerous threat on counter-attacks; he is capable of penetrating between the opposing defensive lines with attacking runs, or getting up the left flank into good offensive positions from which he can receive the ball often, and provide width for his team, essentially acting as an additional forward. 

Moreover, his crossing ability, precise passing, and his eye for the final ball also allow him to function as a secondary playmaker for his team, and enable him to link-up with other players, create goalscoring chances, and provide assists for teammates. While naturally left footed, he is also adept with his right foot, which enables him to cut inside from the left wing, attempt a shot from outside the area, and even score goals. 

Despite his ability going forward, however, the defensive side of Marcelo's game has been brought into question by pundits on occasion, who have cited his defensive solidity, work-rate, concentration, positioning, and awareness as areas of weakness in need of improvement.

Football related business activities
In 2017 Marcelo started investing in football clubs with his company DOZE ("Twelve"). The company became majority shareholder of Campeonato Paranaense club Azuriz based in Marmeleiro, Paraná. Later, in 2021, the company invested in the Portuguese club Mafra.

Personal life
In 2008, Marcelo married his longtime girlfriend Clarice Alves and on 24 September 2009, they had their first child, a son named Enzo Gattuso Alves Vieira. Their second son, Liam was born on 1 September 2015.

He has a number of tattoos, including his shirt number and day of birth (12) tattooed onto his left arm.

He singled out his grandfather, Pedro Vieira, as the main supporter of and inspiration for his footballing career; his grandfather supported him financially so that he could start his career in Brazil. His grandfather died in July 2014, during the World Cup; Marcelo wanted to withdraw from the tournament to attend his funeral but stayed to play with the Brazil team to honor his grandfather's wishes.

On 26 July 2011, Marcelo attained Spanish nationality, which allows him to be registered normally rather than as a non-EU player, of which there is a strict quota allowed.

Sponsorship
In April 2013, Marcelo was unveiled as one of Adidas' new icons for the German brand during a promotional event at the Bernabéu store, showcasing the F50 adiZero and he joins an array of Real Madrid teammates that also wear the Adidas brand including Gareth Bale and Karim Benzema. At the event Marcelo said, "Throughout my career, I have achieved some of my dreams, and this is one too. Being next to these stars is fantastic. They have congratulated me, it's a great brand and I am happy."

Career statistics

Club

International

Scores and results list Brazil's goal tally first:

Honours

Fluminense
Campeonato Carioca: 2005
Taça Rio: 2005

Real Madrid
La Liga: 2006–07, 2007–08, 2011–12, 2016–17, 2019–20, 2021–22
Copa del Rey: 2010–11, 2013–14
Supercopa de España: 2008, 2012, 2017, 2019–20, 2021–22
UEFA Champions League: 2013–14, 2015–16, 2016–17, 2017–18, 2021–22
UEFA Super Cup: 2014, 2016, 2017
FIFA Club World Cup: 2014, 2016, 2017, 2018

Brazil U17
FIFA U-17 World Cup runner-up: 2005

Brazil U23
Summer Olympics silver medal: 2012; bronze medal: 2008

Brazil
FIFA Confederations Cup: 2013

Individual
 Campeonato Brasileiro Série A Team of the Year: 2006
France Football Team of the Decade (2010–2019)
L'Équipe Team of the Season: 2011, 2016, 2017, 2018
ESPN Best Left-back of the Year 2017, 2018
 UEFA Team of the Year: 2011, 2017, 2018
 FIFA FIFPro World XI: 2012, 2015, 2016, 2017, 2018, 2019
 FIFA World Cup Dream Team: 2014, 2018
 La Liga Team of the Season: 2015–16
Facebook FA La Liga Best Defender: 2016
 UEFA Champions League Squad of the Season: 2010–11, 2015–16, 2016–17, 2017–18
 ESM Team of the Year: 2015–16, 2016–17
 IFFHS Men's World Team: 2017, 2018
IFFHS World Team of the Decade: 2011–2020
 IFFHS CONMEBOL Team of the Decade: 2011–2020

See also
 List of footballers with 100 or more UEFA Champions League appearances

Notes

References

External links

Profile at the Fluminense FC website 

1988 births
Living people
Footballers from Rio de Janeiro (city)
Brazilian footballers
Spanish footballers
Brazilian emigrants to Spain
Naturalised citizens of Spain
Association football defenders
Fluminense FC players
Real Madrid CF players
Olympiacos F.C. players
Campeonato Brasileiro Série A players
La Liga players
UEFA Champions League winning players
Brazil youth international footballers
Brazil under-20 international footballers
Olympic footballers of Brazil
Brazil international footballers
Footballers at the 2008 Summer Olympics
Footballers at the 2012 Summer Olympics
2013 FIFA Confederations Cup players
2014 FIFA World Cup players
2018 FIFA World Cup players
Olympic medalists in football
Olympic bronze medalists for Brazil
Olympic silver medalists for Brazil
Medalists at the 2008 Summer Olympics
Medalists at the 2012 Summer Olympics
FIFA Confederations Cup-winning players
Brazilian expatriate footballers
Spanish expatriate footballers
Brazilian expatriate sportspeople in Greece
Spanish expatriate sportspeople in Greece
Expatriate footballers in Greece